Dog, and His Human Speech is a Central African folktale collected by missionary Robert Hamill Nassau, from the Tanga people. According to scholars, the tale is related to the folkloric theme of the Calumniated Wife, and finds parallels with European variants of tale type ATU 707, "The Three Golden Children", of the international Aarne-Thompson-Uther Index.

Summary
A chief named Njambo is already married to a woman named Nyangwa-Mbwa, and they have a son named Mbwa (described as a creature with human speech). Njambo then marries three sisters: Majanga, responsible for cleaning their house; Inyanji, occupied with planting; and Mamĕndi, who is to bear Njambo's children. Mamĕndi is attended by her sisters and gives birth to twin boys. Majanga and Inyanji cast them into the pig-pen. They take two anthills (Nassau attributed it to their conical shape) and present them to Njambo as his sons.

Mbwa finds the boys in the pig-pen and takes them to his mother to rear and suckle. One day when Nyangwa-Mbwa is away, Mamĕndi's jealous sisters kill the twins. Mbwa goes to a person named Nja-ya-melema-mya-bato to get two "heart-lives" to resurrect the twins. The twin boys come back to life and grow up as fine young men. The twin boys hunt game and give Mbwa to bring to his father Njambo. Njambo wonders where Mbwa is finding all these animals to hunt.

Finally, after some years, Mbwa convinces his father to summon all the people in an assembly. Mbwa brings to the assembly the twins, and reveals the whole truth.

Analysis
Folklorist Stith Thompson noted that tale type ATU 707 was "well established in all parts of Africa".

According to Daniel Crowley, researcher May Augusta Klipple, in a preliminary study published in 1938, indicated the existence of 10 variants of tale type 707 from Africa, without specifying their region. However, analysing Klipple's study, scholar Hasan El-Shamy identified that Klipple pointed to 11 variants in the following ethnic groups: 9 tales among Venda, Larusa, Kamba and Masai (East Africa); one from the Sotho (southern Africa), and one from the Hausa (west Africa).

El-Shamy also noted that variants from Subsaharan Africa focus on the rivalry between co-wives and the bond between male twins.

Variants

Central Africa
In this tale, the wife promises to give birth to three children, Manga ("Sea"), Joba ("Sun") and Ngânde ("Moon"). A toucan plays the role of the Speaking Bird and helps the family to reconcile.

West Africa
In a West African tale, local chief Nyame marries other four women, who later move to his house. There, they need to follow the rules of the head-wife, who asks the women what each would give to their husband. The youngest one answers she would bear him a "child of gold" (or "gold-child"), but eventually gives birth to a twin of silver and a twin of gold. The boys are replaced by two frogs, but the whole truth is discovered with a little help from Anansi, the Spider.

In a tale from the Ndowe people of Equatorial Guinea, El cerco de los leones, two sisters confide in each other that they will bear handsome children. The younger, however, confesses that she will bear a boy with a star on the forehead and another on the chest. After the boy's birth, the elder sister replaces her nephew for a piece of wood and throws him into a den of lions.

In a tale from the Dahomey people, collected by Melville J. Herskovits with the title Slandering co-wife: Why there are several attendants at childbirth, a girl named Agenu (or Tohwesi), daughter of King Abiliba Numayago, becomes the second wife to a king called Beu. She becomes heavy with child and when it is time to give birth, she is blindfolded by her husband's other wife. Agenu gives birth to a boy, but the second wife hides the boy in a calabash and replace him for a stone. An old woman who was nearby gets the calabash to raise the boy, while his mother locked in a hut to be insulted by the other wives. Years later, the old woman requests an audience with the king, the prime minister and the second minister. The king gathers the people and the boy is asked to appoint his mother. The old woman reveals the treachery to the king.

Nigeria 
In a Southern Nigerian tale, The Woman with two Skins, king Eyamba I of Calabar has 200 wives, but no son. He is persuaded to marry one of the spider's daughters, but she is so ugly. In fact, this woman, named Adiaha, takes off the ugly skin at night and becomes a beautiful young woman. The king's head wife discovers this and buys a potion form the "Ju Ju man" in order to make the king forget about Adiaha. She succeeds, and the spider's daughter returns home. Adiaha's father contacts another Ju Ju man to prepare an antidote for his daughter to use on her husband. Adiaha returns to king Eyamba, still with her ugly skin disguise, and gives birth to a son, to the jealousy of the head wife. She prepares another potion to make the king fall ill and forget his son. Due to his poor health, he is convinced by the head wife to cast his son in the water, but the boy is saved by a Water Ju Ju. Once again, Adiaha counters the head wife's plot, returns to her husband Eyamba and mothers a daughter. The girl suffers the same fate as her older brother, but is saved by the same Water Ju Ju. Now a young man, the Water Ju Ju advises the king's son to hold a wrestling match to draw the attention of the king. The youth wins every match and is invited to a dinner with the king. The Water Ju Ju advises the youth to summon the people and present his case in front of the king. There, the whole truth is revealed about the head wife's deception. Soon, the king's children and Adiaha are reinstated to their proper place. Folklorist Andrew Lang, on his notes, recalled similar tales of "European folk-lore" wherein the king is deceived and throws his children in the water because he thought his wife gave birth to puppies.

In a Nigerian tale titled The Latchkey Prince,  powerful king has four wives and 15 children, but no son. The fourth wife, named Mebu, is placed in a distant shack, as advised by the king's first wife. One day, a chief priest gives him four palm kernels to be given to his four wives: in order to bear a boy, they must crack the kernels and eat the shells, not the nuts. Following the priest's orders, the king brings the kernels to his four wives: the first three dismiss the shells and eat the nuts, while the shells are collected by a king's servant and given to Mebu. Some time later, the first three wives gives birth to girls, who are abandoned elsewhere, while Mebu gives birth to a boy. However, the elder first wife takes Mebu's son and casts him in the river. He is washed away to a childless old woman's hut, who rescues and raises him, until he grows up as a "latchkey boy". One day, the king's pet dog is chasing a squirrel and finds Mebu's son. The boy pets the dog and begins to sing a song about how the king abandoned him, how the first co-queen is mean, but the king's servant was the boy's saviour. The dog returns to its owner and wags it tail. The meetings between boy and dog happen again and the king follows his pet to the boy's hut, where he finds the boy and recognizes in him a strinking resemblance to himself. Later, he consults with a diviner who confirms their blood relation, but cannot discern who the mother is, so they plan a test: the king's co-wives shall prepare meals for the prince, and from whose dish the prince eats, that is his mother. The first three co-wives prepare grandiose meals for the prince, while Mebu cooks a meagre dish with some leftovers. The prince goes to the table selection and sees only three tables. He is then direct to Mebu's table inside the stables, and eats from her dish, confirming his parentage. With this new revelation, the king divorces from his three co-wives and takes Mebu as his only queen, declaring, henceforth, that no man shall marry more than one wife.

Hausa language
Hermann Gundert Harris published a variant in the Hausa dialect of Kano, with the title Story of a Poor Girl and the Rival Wives. The tale contains barren co-wives, a poor girl giving birth to twins, the replacement for animals, and the children meeting the father.

Another tale from the "Haoussa" (Hausa) was collected by François-Victor Équilbecq from Fatimata Oazi, in Bogandé, in 1911. In this tale, titled Les trois femmes du sartyi ("The sartyi's three wives"), three women, near a marigot (fr), comment among themselves their wishes. The first one says she will give birth to twins with navels of pure gold if she marries the sartyi (a ruler, a king). The other two also promise extraordinary things. The sartyi marries all three. An old woman that was looking for herbs finds the boys and takes them. When they grow up, the twins often provoke the other co-wives when they are taking a bath in the marigot. A griot tells the sartyi of this incident, noting that both boys resembled the king. The sartyi orders that all of his wives shall prepare a meal for the twins, so that they may identify their true mother. Équilbecq noted its similar motifs with European fairy tales and the story from the Arabian Nights: the intrigue of the co-wives and the extraordinary promises of the women.

East Africa
Researcher E. Ojo Arewa devised a classification system for tales from the northern East Africa cattle area. In his system, type 3743 corresponds to type ATU 707. In these tales (one from the Kamba, one from the Larusa, one from the Maasai), the childless wife tries to get rid of the twins born from the other co-wife.

In one tale from the Maasai people, titled 'L-omon loo-'ñgorōyok are oo 'l-mao ("The story of the two wives and the twins") - tabulated by Arewa -, a man is married to two women. The first hasn't born any sons, but the second gives birth to twin boys. The co-wife cuts the boys' fingers and smears their mother's mouth to accuse her of cannibalism. She puts the twins into a drum and casts it in the water. The drum is washed ashore in another country. This version was translated by Carl Meinhof into German.

Southern Africa
In a Khoekhoe tale collected by Leonhard Schultze-Jena, Ariba gye iiguibahe kχoësa or Die Frau, der ein Hund untergeschoben wird, a woman's son is replaced for a dog by jealous women, but he is saved by an aigamuxa. This tale was classified as tale type 707 by Africanist Sigrid Schmidt.

References 

African fairy tales
Twins in fiction
Fictional twins
Child abandonment
Adoption forms and related practices
Adoption, fostering, orphan care and displacement
ATU 700-749